Lisen Bratt (born 23 January 1976) is a Swedish equestrian, born in Stockholm. She competed at the 2000 Summer Olympics in Sydney, and the 2012 Summer Olympics in London.

References

External links

1976 births
Living people
Sportspeople from Stockholm
Swedish female equestrians
Olympic equestrians of Sweden
Equestrians at the 2000 Summer Olympics
Equestrians at the 2012 Summer Olympics